The anime television series Nura: Rise of the Yokai Clan, produced by Studio Deen, is based on the manga series of the same name written and illustrated by Hiroshi Shiibashi. The series is directed by Junji Nishimura with Natsuko Takahashi as scriptwriter and Mariko Oka as character designer. Kohei Tanaka composed the series' music. The first season ran for 24 episodes and aired from July 6, 2010 to December 21, 2010 on Yomiuri TV and other channels. A second season titled Nura: Rise of the Yokai Clan - Demon Capital ran for 24 episodes and aired from July 5, 2011 to December 20, 2011 on Yomiuri TV and other channels. The series is directed by Michio Fukuda with the cast from the first season returning to reprise their roles. In the United States and Canada, the English dub of the anime was broadcast on Viz Media's online network, Neon Alley. Two additional 23-minute OVAs were subsequently released in December 4, 2012 and March 4, 2013 after Demon Capital finished. They were bundled with the limited edition releases of volumes 24 and 25 of the manga.

Series overview

Episode list

Nura: Rise of the Yokai Clan (2010)

Nura: Rise of the Yokai Clan - Demon Capital (2011)

Special
On 23 October 2010, (after episode 17 and before episode 18), a 13-minute-long special episode entitled ぬらりひょんの孫 ～激闘 大フットサル大会！奴良組Wカップ!!～ (Nurarihyon no Mago: Gekitou Dai Futtosaru Taikai! Nuragumi W Cup!!) was shown at Jump Super Anime Tour 2010. It was later included in the Blu-ray release of season 1.

References

Nura: Rise of the Yokai Clan
Nura: Rise of the Yokai Clan episode lists